Assumption of the Virgin is a c. 1638-1639 oil on canvas painting by Guido Reni. It entered its present home at the Alte Pinakothek from the Galerie Düsseldorf in 1806.

References

1638 paintings
1639 paintings
Paintings by Guido Reni
Collection of the Alte Pinakothek
Munich